Barbodes colemani is a species of cyprinid fish. It is endemic to Thailand and restricted to the upper Chao Phraya River basin. It is an uncommon species that inhabits streams and river tributaries, occasionally the mainstreams. Its placement in the genus Barbodes is not universally accepted and the Catalog of Fishes places this species in the genus Discherodontus.

References

colemani
Cyprinid fish of Asia
Fish of Thailand
Endemic fauna of Thailand
Fish described in 1937
Taxa named by Henry Weed Fowler
Taxobox binomials not recognized by IUCN